Isuke Shinmen (23 October 1889 – 8 September 1967) was a Japanese judoka and wrestler. He competed in the men's freestyle lightweight at the 1928 Summer Olympics.

Biography
Initially a practitioner of Sōsuishi-ryū jujutsu, he joined the Kodokan judo school in 1907, training under Sanpo Toku. A specialist in chokeholds, he was known his skill to get them in while standing and then complete them on the ground, although his favorite technique was okuri eri jime.

References

External links
 

1889 births
1967 deaths
Japanese jujutsuka
Japanese male judoka
Japanese male sport wrestlers
Olympic wrestlers of Japan
Wrestlers at the 1928 Summer Olympics
19th-century Japanese people
20th-century Japanese people